In the mathematical theory of probability, a Doob martingale (named after Joseph L. Doob, also known as a Levy martingale) is a stochastic process that approximates a given random variable and has the martingale property with respect to the given filtration. It may be thought of as the evolving sequence of best approximations to the random variable based on information accumulated up to a certain time.

When analyzing sums, random walks, or other additive functions of independent random variables, one can often apply the central limit theorem, law of large numbers, Chernoff's inequality, Chebyshev's inequality or similar tools. When analyzing similar objects where the differences are not independent, the main tools are martingales and Azuma's inequality.

Definition
Suppose  is a filtration, i.e.  when . Define

then  is a martingale, namely Doob martingale, with respect to filtration . 

To see this, note that
 ;

In particular, for any sequence of random variables  on probability space   and function  such that , one could choose 

and filtration  such that

Then, by definition of Doob martingale, process  where

forms a Doob martingale. Note that . This martingale can be used to prove McDiarmid's inequality.

McDiarmid's inequality 

The Doob martingale was introduced by Joseph L. Doob in 1940 to establish concentration inequalities such as McDiarmid's inequality, which applies to functions that satisfy a bounded differences property (defined below) when they are evaluated on random independent function arguments.

More formally, if there are constants  such that for all , and all ,

See also

References

Probabilistic inequalities
Statistical inequalities
Martingale theory